Arab Haitians are Haitian citizens of Arab descent. In Haiti, there are a sizable number of Haitians that are either of Middle-Eastern Arab ancestry or who trace their origins to Arab descendants. Hadrami and Levantine Arabic ancestry can be found within the Arab Haitian community known in Arabic as Bilad al-Sham, primarily Lebanon, Syria and Palestine.

History

The first Arab immigrants to arrive in Haiti reached the shores of the Caribbean country during the middle to late 19th century. During the time, Haiti's business sector was dominated by German and Italian immigrants. Many of them migrated to the countryside where they peddled and were very informal economically speaking. World War I, which took place when Lebanon was part of the Germany-allied Ottoman Empire, triggered a Lebanese migration to the Americas, with Haiti receiving a large number of Lebanese immigrants. Haiti received a score of Palestinian refugees during the 1948 Arab–Israeli War. The country was estimated to have about 300,000 residents of Arab heritage.

Social relations

Arab Haitians are commonly considered as part of the upper class within Haitian society, yet they maintain their own unique presence separate from the very influential and much larger mixed-race and white Haitian populace. For years, they were shunned by the elite mulatto Haitians because of amicable interaction with the poor masses, their willingness to do business with masses and their inability to speak French. This relationship changed gradually over the years as their prominence grew in Haiti's business sector and consequently, a large percentage of them reside and do business in the capital of Port-au-Prince. Middle-class Arab Haitians often are the owners of many of the city's supermarkets.

Notable Arab Haitians

 André Apaid Jr., American-born tycoon (Lebanese descent)
 André Apaid Sr., businessman and political activist who was a strong supporter of Jean-Claude Duvalier (Lebanese descent)
 Antoine Izméry, murdered wealthy businessman and political activist (Palestinian descent)
 Claude Apaid, brother of André Apaid Sr. and owner of the computer company that has secured the government contract to supply voting machines in Haiti (Lebanese descent)
 Issa el Saieh, musician, paint artist, and mini-jazz band leader (Palestinian descent)
 Jessie Al-Khal, manager for the compas band T-Vice; mother of Roberto Martino and Reynaldo Martino (Lebanese descent)
 John Boulos, professional soccer player
 Pierrot Al-Khal, renowned musician for compas band, Les Gypsies de Pétion-Ville (Lebanese descent)
 Robert Malval, Prime Minister of Haiti (1993–1994) (Lebanese descent)
 Samir Mourra, businessman and 2006 Haitian Presidential candidate (Syrian descent)
 Reynaldo Martino, singer, composer and maestro for the popular compas band, T-Vice (partial Lebanese descent)
 Roberto Martino, lead singer and guitarist/composer for the popular compas band, T-Vice (partial Lebanese descent)
 Steeven Saba, Haitian soccer player

See also

 Lebanese Haitians
 Mulatto Haitians
 Palestinian Haitians
 Syrian Haitians
 White Haitians

References

External links
Al-Shorfa - From Lebanon to Haiti: A Story Going Back to the 19th Century

 
Ethnic groups in Haiti